This list of ambassadors of France to Germany and precursors of the modern German state also includes top-ranking French diplomats in Germany who did not formally have the ambassador title.

Ambassadors to the Holy Roman Empire 

 1630–1633: François Leclerc du Tremblay
 1653–1654: François Cazet de Vautorte  
 1658–1674: Robert de Gravel
 1679–1688: Louis de Verjus
 1716–1723: Jacques-Vincent Languet de Gergy 
 1726–1730: Théodore Chevignard de Chavigny 
 1741–1742: Charles Louis Auguste Fouquet de Belle-Isle
 1763–1772: Louis-Gabriel Du Buat-Nançay
 1775–1780: Marc Marie de Bombelles 
 1797–1799: Théobald Bacher

Ambassadors to the German Confederation 
Ambassadors to the German Confederation, also accredited to the Free City of Frankfurt, include:

 1818–1830: Charles-Frédéric Reinhard (1761–1837)
 1830–1839: Jean Baptiste de Alleye de Ciprey (1784-184?)  
 1840–1842: Antoine Louis Deffaudis (1786–1869)  
 1842–1847: Justin de Chasseloup-Laubat (1800–1847)
 1848–1855: Auguste Bonaventure de Tallenay (1795–1863)
 1855–1858: Gustave de Montessuy 
 1858–1864: Alfred de Salignac-Fénelon (1810–1883)
 1864–1866: Edmé de Reculot (1815–1891)

For partial lists, see footnote and.

Ambassadors to German states 

France established permanent diplomatic missions to individual German states during the Thirty Years War or shortly thereafter, most notably Bavaria, Cologne, Prussia, Saxony and the free Hanseatic cities at Hamburg, all of which date from a time around the 1620s to 1640s.

At the time of the German Confederation additional missions were opened in Baden, Hanover, Hesse-Kassel, Hesse-Darmstadt, Nassau and Württemberg. After disestablishment of the German Confederation and establishment of the North-German Confederation, France's mission at Berlin became France's principal mission to Germany.

Ambassadors to the German Empire and Germany (1871–1939) 

For main sources for this section, see footnote and.

Ambassadors to West Germany 
For main sources for this section, see footnote and.

Diplomatic relations between France and Germany were cut following the invasion of Poland in 1939. France restored diplomatic relations with West Germany in 1949 and with East Germany in 1973.

Ambassadors to East Germany 
For the main source for this section, see footnote and.

Diplomatic relations between France and Germany were cut following the invasion of Poland in 1939. France restored diplomatic relations with West Germany in 1949 and with East Germany in 1973.

Ambassadors to post-reunification Germany 
For main sources for this section, see footnote and.

See also
 France–Germany relations

References

 
France
Germany